Chris Haslam (born 1974 in Southport, England) is a British basketball coach and former player.

He played at the University of Wyoming in NCAA Division I in the mid 1990s. He has spent spells all over Europe, with Apollon Patras BC in Greece, RBC Verviers-Pepinster and Euphony Liège in Belgium, Mitteldeutscher BC in Germany and for the last three seasons, Pallacanestro Messina, Teramo Basket and Basket Trapani in Italy. He also played for Everton Tigers in the British Basketball League.

He is now an assistant coach at Montana State University.

References 

1974 births
Living people
Mersey Tigers players
English men's basketball players
Wyoming Cowboys basketball players